Currito of the Cross (Spanish:Currito de la Cruz) is a 1921 novel by the Spanish writer Alejandro Pérez Lugín which portrays the rise of a young bullfighter.

The novel was made into a movie four times. Lugín himself directed a silent film adaptation in 1926. Fernando Delgado directed version in 1936, Luis Lucia directed a 1949 version, and Rafael Gil a 1965 version.

References

Bibliography
 Labanyi, Jo & Pavlović, Tatjana. A Companion to Spanish Cinema. John Wiley & Sons, 2012.

1921 novels
20th-century Spanish novels
Novels set in Seville
Spanish novels adapted into films
Bullfighting books

es:Currito de la Cruz